p-Toluenesulfonyl hydrazide is the organic compound with the formula CH3C6H4SO2NHNH2. It is a white solid that is soluble in many organic solvents but not water or alkanes.  It is a reagent in organic synthesis.

Reactions
With ketones and aldehydes, it condenses to give the hydrazones:
CH3C6H4SO2NHNH2  +  R2C=O → CH3C6H4SO2NHN=CR2  +  H2O

Upon heating in solution, it degrades, releasing diimide (N2H2), a useful reducing agent.  Triisopropylbenzenesulfonylhydrazide is far more useful for this reaction.

Synthesis
Toluenesulfonyl hydrazide is prepared by the reaction of a toluenesulfonyl chloride with hydrazine:
CH3C6H4SO2Cl  + 2 NH2NH2  →  CH3C6H4SO2NHNH2 + + [NH2NH3]Cl

Reactions

Tosylhydrazides can be installed by nucleophilic attack and later removed by base. It thus provides a way to covert C-Cl to C-H.

References

Hydrazides